Monique Smith is a Democratic member of the Ohio House of Representatives representing the 16th district. She was elected in 2020, defeating Republican incumbent Dave Greenspan with just under 51% of the vote in a district where Joe Biden defeated Donald Trump by 13%.

References

Ohio State University alumni
Living people
Democratic Party members of the Ohio House of Representatives
21st-century American politicians
Year of birth missing (living people)